The Oregon Rifles was the first military force organized for the protection of Oregon Country in the Pacific Northwest of North America.  Shortly after the Whitman Massacre, Oregon Governor George Abernethy communicated to the legislature his concern about the seriousness of the conditions, and issued a call for volunteers. A company of 45 men, furnishing their own rifles and equipment, organized in Oregon City and arrived in The Dalles on December 21, 1847.

Those who did not have their own rifles were furnished arms by John McLoughlin. H. A. G. Lee was named captain of the unit.

See also
Cayuse War
Oregon Rangers

References 

Military in Oregon
History of Oregon
Indian wars of the American Old West
1840s in the United States
1847 establishments in Oregon Country